Mitogen-activated protein kinase 1, (MAPK 1),  also known as ERK2, is an enzyme that in humans is encoded by the MAPK1 gene.

Function 
The protein encoded by this gene is a member of the MAP kinase family. MAP kinases, also known as extracellular signal-regulated kinases (ERKs), act as an integration point for multiple biochemical signals, and are involved in a wide variety of cellular processes such as proliferation, differentiation, transcription regulation and development. The activation of this kinase requires its phosphorylation by upstream kinases. Upon activation, this kinase translocates to the nucleus of the stimulated cells, where it phosphorylates nuclear targets. Two alternatively spliced transcript variants encoding the same protein, but differing in the UTRs, have been reported for this gene. MAPK1  contains multiple amino acid sites that are phosphorylated and ubiquitinated.

Model organisms

Model organisms have been used in the study of MAPK1 function. A conditional knockout mouse line, called Mapk1tm1a(EUCOMM)Wtsi was generated as part of the International Knockout Mouse Consortium program—a high-throughput mutagenesis project to generate and distribute animal models of disease to interested scientists.

Male and female animals underwent a standardized phenotypic screen to determine the effects of deletion. Twenty seven tests were carried out on mutant mice and three significant abnormalities were observed. No homozygous mutant embryos were identified during gestation, and therefore none survived until weaning. The remaining tests were carried out on heterozygous mutant adult mice and males had decreased circulating amylase levels.

Conditional deletion of Mapk1 in B cells showed a role for MAPK1 in T-cell-dependent antibody production. A dominant gain-of-function mutant of Mapk1 in transgenic mice showed a role for MAPK1 in T-cell development.  Conditional inactivation of Mapk1 in neural progenitor cells of the developing cortex lead to a reduction of cortical thickness and reduced proliferation in neural progenitor cells.

Interactions 

MAPK1 has been shown to interact with:

 ADAM17, 
 CIITA, 
 DUSP1, 
 DUSP22, 
 DUSP3, 
 ELK1, 
 FHL2, 
 HDAC4, 
 MAP2K1, 
 MAP3K1 
 MAPK14, 
 MKNK1, 
 MKNK2, 
 Myc, 
 NEK2, 
 PEA15, 
 PTPN7, 
 Phosphatidylethanolamine binding protein 1, 
 RPS6KA1, 
 RPS6KA2, 
 RPS6KA3, 
 SORBS3, 
 STAT5A, 
 TNIP1, 
 TOB1, 
 TSC2, 
 UBR5, and
 VAV1.

Clinical significance 
Mutations in MAPK1 are implicated in many types of cancer.

See also 
 Extracellular signal-regulated kinases

References

Further reading

External links 
 MAP Kinase Resource  .

Mitogen-activated Protein Kinases
EC 2.7.11
Moonlighting proteins
Genes mutated in mice